Nikos Portokaloglou (born 30 December 1957) is a Greek singer, songwriter and lyricist. He started his career in 1980, when he founded the music band Fatme. The first album of the band released in 1982 under the title Fatme. The band had great success and released six albums. Some of the most successful album of that period are Taxidi and Vgenoume apo to tunnel. Since 1990, he started a solo career and he continues until now. From this period, notable album are Brazilero, Ta Karavia mou Kaio and Dipsa. He has written movies soundtracks. Some of them was for the movies Akropol, Valkanizater and Brazilero. In 2002 he won 3 Arion awards in categories best song, best entechno album and best movie soundtrack. He has cooperated with important Greek singer such as Haris Alexiou, Melina Kana, Eleftheria Arvanitaki and others.

Discography

as Fatme member
1982 Fatme (Φατμέ)
1983 Psemmata (Ψέμματα)
1985 Risko (Ρίσκο)
1986 Vgenoume apo to tunel (Βγαίνουμε από το τούνελ)
1988 Taxidi (Ταξίδι)
1989 Palko (Πάλκο)

Solo career
1990 Fones (Φωνές)
1991 Siko psychi mou, siko chorepse (Σήκω ψυχή μου, σήκω χόρεψε)
1993 Ta karavia mou keo (Τα καράβια μου καίω)
1996 Asotos ios (Άσωτος υιός)
1997 Kryfto (Κρυφτό)
1999 Pechnidia me ton diavolo (Παιγνίδια με τον διάβολο)
2001 Braziliero (Μπραζιλέρο)
2002 Thalassa Remixes (Θάλασσα Remixes)
2002 Iparchi logos sovaros (Υπάρχει λόγος σοβαρός)
2003 Dipsa (Δίψα)
2005 Pame alli mia fora (Πάμε άλλη μια φορά)
2005 Pame alli mia fora (Πάμε άλλη μια φορά) Special edition
2006 To potami (Το ποτάμι)
2006 Ena vima pio konta (Ένα βήμα πιο κοντά)
2007 Ektos schediou (Εκτός σχεδίου)
2008 I svura ke alles istories (Η σβούρα και άλλες ιστορίες)
2009 Strofi (Στροφή)
2010 Apopse ine orea (Απόψε είναι ωραία)
2012 Issos (Ίσως)
2014 Limania xena (Λιμάνια Ξένα)
2017 Eisitirio (εισητιριο)

References

External links
Official site
Portokaloglou, Discography

20th-century Greek male singers
Greek composers
1957 births
Living people
Musicians from Volos
21st-century Greek male singers
People from Volos